Party in the Paddock is an annual 3-day music festival presented by Triple J that is held in  Launceston, Tasmania, Australia.
Their first festival began in 2013 with local acts only.

Lineups year by year
As listed on the official website. Bold indicates headline act. All acts are Australian unless stated otherwise.

Artist lineups
Headline acts highlighted in bold.

2014
 Kingswood
  Sticky Fingers
 Stonefield
 Sam Simmons
 Thomas Jack
 Kingfisha
 Benjalu 
 Bec & Ben
 The Lazys
 Guthrie
 Heloise
 Enola Fall
 Chase City
 The Lyrical
 The Blue Ruins
 The Pretty Littles
 Younger Dryars
 Christopher Coleman Collective
 The Vanns

Lyall Moloney, Big Nothing, The Mornings, Jed Appleton, Pete Cornelius and The Devilles, The Lawless Quartet, The Embers, Zac Slater Trio, Bootleg Rascal, Captives, Lulu & The Paige Turners, Adam Cousens, Dark Matter Of Story Telling, 7th Street Entry, Joseph Joseph, The 88's, The Bone Shack, Ursine, Shanti Dreads

2015
 The Beautiful Girls
 Allday
 Jinja Safari
 Dune Rats
 The Smith Street Band
 Tommy Franklin
 Willow Beats
 The Delta Riggs
 Dappled Cities
 Luca Brasi
 Little Bastard
 KLP (DJ Set)
 Drunk Mums
 The Dead Love
 Younger Dryas
 The Middle Names
 Akouo
 Save The Clock Tower
 Sheriff
 Lepers & Crooks
 Our House
 The Familiars
 Briggie Smalls
+ more

2016
 Violent Soho
 Spiderbait
 The Preatures
 British India
 Tkay Maidza
 Vallis Alps
 Bad Dreems
 Harts
 Roland Tings
 Tired Lion
 Ecca Vandal
 Nina Las Vegas
 Sleepmakeswaves
 Lurch & Chief
 The Belligerents
 Akouo
 Hockey Dad
 Koi Child
 The Bennies
 Ocean Alley
 The Embers
 Jed Appleton
 Denni
 Dameza
 Kowl
+ more

2017
 Sticky Fingers
Hermitude
 The Smith Street Band
 Tash Sultana
 Paces
 Opiuo
 Remi
 Kim Churchill
 Vera Blue
 Montaigne
 Luca Brasi
 Boo Seeka
 The Bennies
 Sampa the Great
 Skegss
 KLP
 Lyall Moloney
 The Vanns
 Trophy Eyes
 The Pretty Littles
 Gold Member
 Planet
 Guthrie
 PITP Allstars
 Sheriff
 Denni
 Chase City
 Elegant Shiva
 The Saxons
 Sumner
 The Bad Dad Orchestra
 Banquet
 Bad Beef
 Isla Ka
 The Sleepyheads
 Sundaze
 Sofala

2018
 Grouplove (USA)
 Gang Of Youths
 The Avalanches (DJ Set)
 Meg Mac
 Ball Park Music
 Client Liaison
 The Preatures
 Thundamentals
 Tkay Maidza
 Mallrat
 Holy Holy
 Aunty Donna
 Crooked Colours
 Kirin J. Callinan
 Tired Lion
 Waax
 30//70
 Psychedelic Porn Crumpets
 Kinder
 Dear Seattle
 Baker Boy
 Godlands
 POW! Negro
 Slowly Slowly
 Drop Legs
 Younger Dryas
 The Saxons
 Sumner
 Sofala
 The Bad Dad Orchestra
 Slim Jeffries
 Kallidad
 Lincoln Le Fevre
 Angharad Drake
 Lazer Baby
 Sundaze
 Bad Beef
 Bansheeland
 S L O W
 Jack Mclaine & Friends
 King Cake
 Emma Anglesey
 Flxw
 +triple j Unearthed Winner

2019
Lily Allen (UK)
The Presets
The Jungle Giants
Vera Blue
DZ Deathrays
Winston Surfshirt
Middle Kids
Luca Brasi
Yungblud (UK)
Riton & Kah-Lo (UK)
Remi
G Flip
Didirri
Alex the Astronaut
Alice Ivy
Slowly Slowly
Haiku Hands
Maddy Jane
Kwame
Cable Ties
Kinder
Good Doogs
Adrian Eagle
Thando
Tyne-James Organ
A. Swayze & The Ghosts
Matt Okine + Gen Fricker
Drop Legs
Imbi The Girl
The Saxons
Amastro
Chase City
Tomgirl
The Sleepyheads
Kat Edwards
Ewah & The Vision Of Paradise
Seaside
Stevie Jean
Hugo Bladel
Empire Park
Squeef
Meres
Good Lekker
Bone Shack
Teens
Rat Child

2020
Matt Corby
Hermitude
Dune Rats
Broods (NZ)
Cosmo's Midnight
Jack River
Sneaky Sound System
Briggs
Mallrat
Mahalia (UK)
Lime Cordiale
Confidence Man
Odette
The Chats
Dear Seattle
Tora
I Know Leopard
Press Club
These New South Whales
Arno Faraji
True Vibenation
The Dead Love
Ninajirachi
The Butlers (NZ)
Claire Anne Taylor
The Vanns
Miiesha
Bakers Eddy
Klue
First Beiege
Ro
Batz
Denni
Raccoon Dog
Cool Out Sun
100
The Buoys
Ant Beard
Karate Boogaloo
The Embers
Isla Ka
Darvid Thor
Hurricane Youth
Jay Jarome Band
Celeste
Slaughterhäus Surf Cult
In the Flowers
Meg Hitchcock (UK)
Medhanit
Mangana Dancers

References

Rock festivals in Australia
Recurring events established in 2013